A hanging man is a type of candlestick pattern in financial technical analysis. It is a bearish reversal pattern made up of just one candle. It has a long lower wick and a short body at the top of the candlestick with little or no upper wick. In order for a candle to be a valid hanging man most traders say the lower wick must be two times greater than the size of the body portion of the candle, and the body of the candle must be at the upper end of the trading range.

See also
 Hammer — Hanging man pattern found in a downtrend

External links
Video and chart examples of hanging man pattern
 Hanging man pattern at onlinetradingconcepts.com
 Hanging man definition at investopedia.com
 Hanging Man Information at candlecharts.com

Candlestick patterns